Whitmer may refer to:

Whitmer Peninsula, a peninsula on the coast of Victoria Land, Antarctica
Whitmer High School, in Toledo, Ohio, United States
Whitmer, West Virginia, a census-designated place in Randolph County, West Virginia, United States

People with the surname
B. J. Whitmer (born 1978), American professional wrestler
Christian Whitmer (1798–1835), son of Peter Whitmer, Sr. and Mary Musselman
Dan Whitmer (born 1955), professional baseball player and coach
David Whitmer (1805–1888), early adherent of the Latter Day Saint movement, Witness to the Book of Mormon's golden plates
Gretchen Whitmer (born 1971), Governor of Michigan
Jacob Whitmer (1800–1856), son of Peter Whitmer, Sr. and Mary Musselman
John Whitmer (1802–1878), early leader in the Latter Day Saint movement
Mary Mussleman Whitmer (1778–1856), Book of Mormon witness and the wife of Peter Whitmer, Sr.
Peter Whitmer Sr. (1773–1854), early member of the Latter Day Saint movement
Peter Whitmer Jr. (1809–1836), sone of Peter Whitmer, Sr. and Witnesses of the Book of Mormon

See also
Witmer (disambiguation)
Whitmore (disambiguation)
Wittmar, Lower Saxony, Germany
Wittmer, a surname
John Whitmer Historical Association (JWHA), a nonprofit organization promoting study of the LDS movement
Peter Whitmer log home, historic site located in Fayette, New York, United States